Noriko Shibuta (born 3 May 1972) is a Japanese rower. She competed in the women's lightweight double sculls event at the 1996 Summer Olympics.

References

1972 births
Living people
Japanese female rowers
Olympic rowers of Japan
Rowers at the 1996 Summer Olympics
Sportspeople from Aomori Prefecture